Life of Pi is a play based on the best-selling novel of the same name by Yann Martel adapted for the stage by Lolita Chakrabarti.

The play premiered in June 2019 at the Crucible Theatre, Sheffield before transferring to the Wyndham's Theatre in London's West End in November 2021. The play won five Laurence Olivier Awards (including Best New Play), five UK Theatre Awards (including Best New Play) and Best New Play at the WhatsOnStage Awards.

Production history

Sheffield (2019) 
The play was commissioned by producer Simon Friend, and after a series of workshops over two years, made its world premiere at the Crucible Theatre, Sheffield running from 28 June until 20 July 2019. The play is directed by Max Webster.

London (2021-2023) 
Following the success of the Sheffield run, the play opened in London's West End at the Wyndham's Theatre, produced by Simon Friend, beginning previews on 15 November 2021, with an official opening on 2 December. The play was originally due to open in June 2020 however was postponed due to the COVID-19 pandemic. Following extensions to the run due to popular demand, the play closed on 15 January 2023. The production was filmed live by National Theatre Live and will be broadcast to cinemas from 30 March 2023.

A.R.T. and Broadway (2023) 
The play made its North American premiere at the A.R.T in Cambridge, Massachusetts running from December 4, 2022 to January 29, 2023 before opening on Broadway at the Gerald Schoenfeld Theatre on March 30, 2023 (with previews from March 9).  The cast from the A.R.T. run will reprise their roles with Hiran Abeysekera reprising his Olivier Award-winning role as Pi (with Adi Dixit who played Pi in the A.R.T. run joining as the Alternate Pi) with Fred Davis and Scarlet Wilderink reprising their Olivier Award-winning role of Richard Parker (joining the A.R.T. puppeteering team).

UK and Ireland tour (2023-24) 
The play will begin a UK and Ireland tour opening by returning to Sheffield at the Lyceum Theatre on 29 August 2023 and touring until July 2024. Casting is to be announced.

Cast and characters

Reception 
The play received rave reviews from critics and audiences in both the Sheffield and London productions.

Awards and nominations

Sheffield production

London production

External links 
 Official website

References 

2019 plays
Plays based on novels
British plays
Laurence Olivier Award-winning plays
West End plays
Broadway plays